Akal Academy is a chain of co-educational, English, medium, very high cost and public schools that follow the Central Board of Secondary Education curriculum. They are affiliated with the C.B.S.E in the rural areas of Punjab, Haryana, Rajasthan, Himachal, Pradesh, and Uttar Pradesh. The students are mostly from the deprived sections of the society and are admitted regardless of caste, creed, region, religion or social status. It has 129 branches across India but the main branch is Akal Academy Baru Sahib, which is located at Sirmaur district of Himachal Pradesh. Its 116 branches organize walkathons in four states, Punjab, Haryana, Uttar Pradesh and Rajasthan, wherein hundreds of students educate villagers on the harmful effects of drugs.

References 

Co-educational schools in India
High schools and secondary schools in Himachal Pradesh
Educational institutions established in 1987
1987 establishments in Rajasthan